Audh may refer to:

 AUDH, an abbreviation for the chemical (Aldos-2-ulose dehydratase)
 Audh, a princely state of Northern India